Soodla is a village in Anija Parish, Harju County, Estonia. 

The village is situated on the banks of the Soodla river. The river flows into Jägala river in the village.

As of August 1, 2020, the village had a population of 69.

References

External links 
 Anija Parish homepage

Villages in Harju County